The Tennessee Lady Volunteers softball team represents the University of Tennessee (UT) in Knoxville, Tennessee in NCAA Division I women's softball competition. Coached by Karen Weekly, the team has become a consistently top tier team in the Southeastern Conference (SEC).

Along with all other UT women's sports teams, it used the nickname "Lady Volunteers" (or the short form "Lady Vols") until the 2015–16 school year, when the school dropped the "Lady" prefix from the nicknames of all women's teams except in basketball. In September 2017, the “Lady Volunteers” name was reinstated for all women’s athletics teams.

Overview

 
The Lady Vols first fielded a softball team in 1996 with Jim Beitia as head coach. In 2002, Tennessee brought in the husband and wife team of Ralph and Karen Weekly as co-head coaches. Since 2004, the team has reached the NCAA Tournament every year and the Women's College World Series five times. In 2007 the Lady Vols managed to make history finished 63–8 for the program's best winning percentage of .887. A third-straight trip to the WCWS ended with Tennessee becoming the first SEC program to reach the best-of-three NCAA Championship Series, before falling to champion Arizona. That year the team managed two wins over No. 4 Arizona and triumphs against No. 6 Northwestern and No. 7 Texas A&M which led to Tennessee spending a record 11 consecutive weeks at No. 1 in the ESPN.com/USA Softball poll, becoming the first SEC school to reach the top ranking in the league's softball history.

Sherri Parker Lee Stadium

The Sherri Parker Lee Stadium is the home venue for the Lady Vols, replacing Tyson Park. Opened in 2008, the stadium can seat 1,614 spectators as well as three press boxes, four VIP suites and an observation deck for television crews.  In addition to Tennessee home games, Lee Stadium has hosted the SEC softball tournament (in 2009 and 2017) and exhibition games involving the US national team (2008) and the Dutch national team (2011, 2012).

Its other amenities include a kitchen, 30-seat theater, trophy room and a recreation room with a big-screen television, pool table, video games and comfortable furniture for the student-athletes. The locker room is also equipped with full laundry facilities, a mud room, 24 large lockers, shower and bathroom facilities. Also next to the clubhouse is one of the largest batting cage facilities in the nation. It contains four 16-by- cages which are designed to provide plenty of room to walk or film between each. All four cages are covered from the weather and possess high-quality Astroturf.

In 2011 the field was recognized as the NFCA/Stabilizer Solutions Field of the Year.

In 2017 general admission outfield bleachers were added to the stadium.

Head Coach

Karen Weekly took over as sole head coach in 2021, having previously served as co-head coach alongside her husband Ralph Weekly since 2002.

Since Ralph and Karen Weekly took over the Lady Vols they have guided the program from a team struggling to make a name for themselves in the SEC to a team that has garnered world recognition for their success. The National Fastpitch Coaches Association (NFCA) has chosen to honor Ralph for his efforts throughout a distinguished, three-decade career, that has spanned from his time in the U.S. Air Force through stops at Pacific Lutheran, Chattanooga and now Tennessee, with a 2011 induction into the NFCA Hall of Fame.

Voted in by his coaching peers and with the organization consisting of just 49 previous inclusions, Ralph Weekly will join Ithaca head coach Deb Pallozzi in ceremonies to be held at the annual NFCA Convention. Ralph and Karen have taken the Vols to their first Southeastern Conference regular season and tournament championships as well as the team's first Women's College World Series appearance.

Their overall record at Tennessee is 465–150–2 and they have recorded the programs most wins in a season with 67, a then national record in the NCAA. Ralph and Karen have also authored a book, High-Scoring Softball.

Year-by-year results

NCAA Tournament seeding history
National seeding began in 2005. The Tennessee Volunteers are one of only three teams to have a national seed every year, along with Florida and Alabama.

Awards and honors

All-Americans

The Tennessee Volunteers softball program has garnered 36 Louisville Slugger/NFCA All-American honors.

Monica Abbott – 2004, 2005, 2006, and 2007 NFCA All-American
Tonya Callahan – 2006, 2007, and 2008 NFCA All-American
Raven Chavanne – 2010, 2011, 2012 and 2013 NFCA All-American
India Chiles – 2007 NFCA All-American
Kat Dotson – 2010 NFCA All-American
Kristi Durant – 2005 and 2006 NFCA All-American
Sarah Fekete – 2005 and 2006 NFCA All-American
Rainey Gaffin – 2015, 2016 NFCA All-American
Lauren Gibson – 2011, 2012 and 2013 NFCA All-American
Meghan Gregg – 2017 and 2018 NFCA All-American
Tiffany Huff – 2009 NFCA All-American
Aubrey Leach – 2018 NFCA All-American
Ellen Renfroe – 2011 and 2012 NFCA All-American 
Lindsay Schutzler – 2005, 2006, and 2007 NFCA All-American
Madison Shipman – 2012, 2013, and 2014 NFCA All-American

National awards
USA Softball Collegiate Player of the Year
Monica Abbott – 2007

Honda Sports Award for Softball
Monica Abbott – 2007
Madison Shipman – 2014

NFCA Golden Shoe Award
Raven Chavanne – 2013

lNFCA National Freshman of the Year
Annie Aldrete – 2014

Senior Class Award
Madison Shipman – 2014

Conference awards
SEC Player of the Year
India Chiles – 2007
Tonya Callahan – 2008
Lauren Gibson – 2013
Madison Shipman – 2014
Meghan Gregg – 2017
SEC Pitcher of the Year
Monica Abbott – 2004, 2005, 2007

SEC Freshman of the Year
Monica Abbott – 2004
Kat Dotson – 2010
Ellen Renfroe – 2011
Caylan Arnold – 2017

See also
List of NCAA Division I softball programs

References

External links